Tommy John Irwin (born 6 October 1932) was a Scottish footballer who played for Dumbarton and Darlington.

References

1932 births
Scottish footballers
Dumbarton F.C. players
Scottish Football League players
Living people
Place of birth missing (living people)
Association football midfielders